Bye Bye Birdie-Irma La Douce (full title The Chico Hamilton Quintet Plays Selections from Bye Bye Birdie-Irma La Douce) is an album by drummer and bandleader Chico Hamilton featuring jazz adaptations of tunes from the Broadway musicals Bye Bye Birdie and Irma La Douce recorded in 1960 and released on the Columbia label.

Reception 

AllMusic rated the album two stars.

Track listing 
Side 1:
All compositions by Marguerite Monnot
 "Irma La Douce" - 3:52
 "Our Language of Love" - 3:47
 "From a Prison Cell" - 4:01
 "She's Got the Lot" - 2:57
 "There Is Only One Paris for That" - 3:41
Side 2:
All compositions by Charles Strouse and Lee Adams
 "A Lot of Livin' to Do" - 5:49
 "Baby, Talk to Me" - 3:06
 "Put On a Happy Face" - 2:42
 "How Lovely to Be a Woman" - 3:55
 "Kids!" - 2:38

Personnel 
Chico Hamilton - drums
Charles Lloyd - alto saxophone, flute
Nathan Gershman - cello
Harry Pope - guitar
Bobby Haynes - bass

References 

1961 albums
Chico Hamilton albums
Columbia Records albums